Under Siege is a 1992 American action thriller film directed by Andrew Davis, written by J. F. Lawton, and starring Steven Seagal as a former Navy SEAL who must intercept a group of mercenaries, led by Tommy Lee Jones, after they commandeer the U.S. Navy battleship .

Released on October 9, 1992, Under Siege was both a critical and commercial success, receiving two Academy Award nominations for sound production and grossing over $156 million at the global box office. It is often considered Steven Seagal's best film to date. It was followed in 1995 by a sequel, Under Siege 2: Dark Territory, which was not as well received.

Plot 
The battleship  arrives at Pearl Harbor, where then-President George H. W. Bush announces that the ship will be decommissioned in California. Casey Ryback, a chief petty officer assigned as a culinary specialist, prepares meals in celebration of the birthday of commanding officer Captain Adams, against the orders of executive officer Commander Krill, who is having food and entertainment brought by helicopter. Krill provokes a tussle with Ryback. Unable to imprison Ryback in the brig without clearance from the captain, Krill detains Ryback in a freezer and places Marine Private Nash on guard. A helicopter lands on the ship's deck with a musical band and a group of caterers (who are in fact a band of mercenaries led by disillusioned former CIA operative William "Bill" Strannix), and also with Playboy Playmate Jordan Tate.

Strannix's forces seize control of the ship with Krill's help. Several officers are killed, including Captain Adams. The surviving ship's company are imprisoned in the forecastle, except for some stragglers in unsecured areas. Ryback hears the gunshots and persuades Nash to call the bridge, inadvertently reminding Krill of this loose end. Strannix sends two mercenaries to eliminate Ryback and Nash. Nash is killed, but Ryback slays the assassins, runs into Tate, who was sedated during the takeover, and reluctantly allows her to tag along.

Strannix and his men seize control of the ship's weapon systems, shooting down a jet sent to investigate, and plan on covering their escape by using missiles to obliterate tracking systems in Pearl Harbor. Strannix intends to sell the ship's Tomahawks by unloading them onto a submarine he previously hijacked from North Korea, as revenge for the CIA trying to assassinate him prior to the events of the film.

Strannix contacts Admiral Bates at the Pentagon to make demands, but then learns that Ryback has escaped. Krill discovers that Ryback is a former Navy SEAL with extensive training in counterterrorism tactics; Captain Adams kept him on as a cook after Ryback was demoted for striking a superior officer because a mission in Panama backfired due to inadequate intel, and Krill was unaware of this beforehand as Ryback's file was kept in the captain's personal safe. Ryback contacts Bates and is told that the Navy plans to send a SEAL team to retake the ship. Ryback moves throughout the ship, eliminating any hijackers he comes across. To keep the missile-theft plan in place, Krill activates the fire suppression system in the forecastle, leaving the crew members to drown. The terrorists correctly assume this will force Ryback to refocus his efforts to rescue his crew mates, and set up an ambush in anticipation.

Ryback and Tate come upon six imprisoned sailors. Together, they overcome the ambush and shut off the water in the forecastle. Ryback shuts down Missouris weapon systems to allow the incoming Navy SEALs to land, but the submarine crew shoots down the helicopter carrying the Navy SEALs with shoulder-fired surface-to-air missiles. The Pentagon responds by ordering an air strike that will sink Missouri. Strannix regains control of the ship's weapon systems and loads the Tomahawks onto the submarine. With the aid of a retired World War II gunner's mate among the rescued sailors, Ryback uses the battleship's 16 inch guns to attack the submarine, killing Krill and everyone on board.

His plan foiled, Strannix launches two retaliatory nuclear-tipped Tomahawks towards Honolulu. As the sailors retake the ship, Ryback finds his way into the control room, where he encounters Strannix; Ryback and Strannix recognize each other from prior operations they participated in, and the two engage in a knife fight. Ryback gains the upper hand and kills Strannix, then uses the launch code disk needed to destroy the Tomahawk missiles. A jet obliterates one of the missiles, and the other is deactivated just in time; the Navy calls off its airstrike.

The remaining crew members are released as the ship sails towards San Francisco harbor. A funeral ceremony for Captain Adams is held on the deck of Missouri, showing Ryback saluting the captain's casket in his formal dress uniform with full decorations.

Cast 

{{Cast listing|
 Steven Seagal as Chief Petty Officer Casey Ryback, a former Navy SEAL who currently serves as the culinary specialist of Missouri.
 Tommy Lee Jones as William Strannix, a renegade, embittered former CIA operative who leads the team of terrorists.
 Gary Busey as Commander Peter Krill, Missouri'''s sociopath, corrupt executive officer who serves as an inside man and second in-command of Strannix.
 Erika Eleniak as Jordan Tate, a Playboy Playmate model "Miss July '89" (the same as Eleniak was in real life) who came on board to entertain the ship's personnel and becomes Ryback's sidekick.
 Colm Meaney as Daumer, Strannix's lead commando.
 Patrick O'Neal as Captain J.T. Adams, Commanding Officer of Missouri.
 Andy Romano as Admiral Bates, a high-ranking member of the Joint Chiefs of Staff.
 Dale Dye as Captain Nick Garza, Admiral Bates's advisor and a Navy SEAL who vouches for Ryback.
 Nick Mancuso as Tom Breaker, the director of the CIA and Strannix's former boss.
 Damian Chapa as Tackman, a sailor onboard Missouri.
 Tom Wood as Private Nash, a naive United States Marine.
 Troy Evans as Granger, an officer aboard the ship.
 Dennis Lipscomb as Trenton, National Security Advisor.
 Bernie Casey as Commander Harris, a high-ranking officer in the Missouri.
 Glenn Morshower as Ensign Taylor, an arrogant junior officer who strongly dislikes Ryback.
 Raymond Cruz as Ramirez, Ryback's assistant cook.
 Sandy Ward as Calaway, a gunner's mate who served on Missouri during World War II.
 George Cheung as a commando, Pitt's technical assistant (credited as George Kee Cheung).
 Kane Hodder as a commando.
 Richard Andrew Jones as Pitt, Strannix's technician.
}}

 Production 
The film was based on an original spec script by J. F. Lawton called Dreadnought which sold for $1 million.

Warners wanted Steven Seagal to star in the film but he turned it down at first. Seagal later said he had problems with the role of a character "who is at first a bimbo jumping out of a cake and gets paired up with me." But he said that in revisions of the script, the role became a character "who gradually reveals her intelligence."

Lawton said "We are trying to make him [Seagal] more mainstream...getting him out of the pure action genre and into an acting role." The writer added "I'm trying to bring the budget within a reasonable range. The original script was almost irresponsible, with things like battleships getting blown up...the way it was, Dreadnought would have cost $100 million-plus to make. Now we're looking at the $30 million range... It was Steven's idea to fit the Pearl Harbor Memorial into the film, because all these incredible ships would be there—a spectacular sight."

Director Andrew Davis had previously made Above the Law with Steven Seagal. Davis later said "Terry Semel wanted us to get back together again saying that Seagal was only in the movie 41 minutes. Tommy Lee is in the movie longer than Steven. It was fine, it was fine. It worked out well. We had a nice time down in Mobile and had a lot of fun making the movie, and that was the movie that got me The Fugitive so it was worth it."

The film also featured footage of the real Missouri sailing in Pearl Harbor, the Pacific Ocean, and San Francisco Bay.

The film makes extensive use of the Introvision process, a variation of front projection that allows realistic three-dimensional interaction of foreground characters with projected backgrounds without the heavy cost of traditional bluescreen effects. The technique was also used in the films Outland, Megaforce, Army of Darkness and Andrew Davis' later film, The Fugitive.

"Most people are surprised that the film is as sophisticated as it is," Davis said. "It appeals to people who have a point of view about nuclear weapons and the story thrusts you into an incredible situation that is not far-fetched."

The original title Dreadnought did not test well with audiences, the marketing department wanted to give the film a three word title like other Seagal films and came up with the title Last to Surrender. Lawton and Seagal both hated the title, and Seagal fought to have it changed, and the film ended up with the title Under Siege.

 Reception 
 Box office 
On its opening weekend, Under Siege made $15,760,003 from 2,042 theaters, with a $7,717 average. From there, it went on to make $83,563,139. Worldwide, it made $156,563,139. At the time, it was the most successful film that had not been screened for any critics prior to its release.

 Critical response 
Audiences polled by CinemaScore gave the film an average grade of "A−" on an A+ to F scale.

Reviewers praised Tommy Lee Jones and Gary Busey's performances as the film's villains. Rotten Tomatoes gives the film a score of 79% based on reviews from 28 critics. The site's consensus states: "A well-directed action thriller that makes the most of its confined setting, Under Siege marks a high point for early '90s action—and its star's spotty filmography." This is one of the few Steven Seagal films to receive a fresh rating on Rotten Tomatoes, along with Executive Decision and Machete, being called "Die Hard on a battleship" by film critics.

It was also the only Seagal movie to receive an Academy Award nomination, earning two nominations for Best Sound Effects Editing (John Leveque and Bruce Stambler) and for Best Sound (Donald O. Mitchell, Frank A. Montaño, Rick Hart and Scott D. Smith). It did not win in either category.

Harrison Ford saw a rough cut of the film and approved director Andrew Davis for The Fugitive (1993).

 Future 
Sequel
A sequel, Under Siege 2: Dark Territory'', was released on July 15, 1995, with Seagal, Romano, Mancuso and Dye reprising their roles.

Reboot
In November 2021, a reboot of the original was in development for HBO Max, with Timo Tjahjanto and Umair Aleem attached to direct and write the film.

See also 
 List of films featuring the United States Navy SEALs

References

External links 

 
 
 
 

1992 films
1992 action thriller films
American action thriller films
Films about nuclear war and weapons
Films about ship hijackings
Films about terrorism
Films directed by Andrew Davis
Films scored by Gary Chang
Films set in Hawaii
Films shot in Mobile, Alabama
Regency Enterprises films
Siege films
StudioCanal films
Techno-thriller films
Warner Bros. films
Films about the United States Navy
Films set on ships
Films shot in San Francisco
Films shot in Hawaii
Films set in the Pacific Ocean
Films produced by Arnon Milchan
1990s English-language films
1990s American films